The 1981 Houston Astros season was the 20th season for the Major League Baseball (MLB) franchise in Houston, Texas. The season was divided into two halves because of a players' strike in mid-season. The Astros won the Western Division of the National League in the second half and advanced to the playoffs, which matched the winners of the two halves in a Division Series (the name would be re-introduced fourteen years later). However, they were defeated in five games by the Los Angeles Dodgers in the Division Series.

Offseason 
 December 4, 1980: Don Sutton was signed as a free agent by the Astros.
 December 8, 1980: Chris Bourjos was traded by the San Francisco Giants with Bob Knepper to the Houston Astros for Enos Cabell.
 March 27, 1981: Julio González was released by the Astros.

Regular season

Season standings

Record vs. opponents

Notable transactions 
 April 1, 1981: Chris Bourjos was traded by the Houston Astros with cash to the Baltimore Orioles for Kiko Garcia.
 April 3, 1981: Gary Rajsich was traded by the Astros to the New York Mets for John Csefalvay (minors).
 April 17, 1981: David Clyde was signed as a free agent by the Astros.
 June 7, 1981: Joaquín Andújar was traded by the Astros to the St. Louis Cardinals for Tony Scott.
 June 8, 1981: Eric Bullock was drafted by the Houston Astros in the 1st round (20th pick) of the 1981 amateur draft (Secondary Phase).

Nolan Ryan's 5th No-Hitter 
On September 26, 1981, Nolan Ryan no-hit the Los Angeles Dodgers, 5-0, on national television. The 34-year-old right-hander became the first pitcher to throw five career no-hitters. It had been six years since Ryan's last no-hitter; he pitched for the California Angels for the last of four no-hitters.

Roster

Game log

Regular season (First half)

|-style="background:#fcc;"
| 1 || April 9 || 3:05p.m. CST || @ Dodgers || L 0–2 || Valenzuela (1–0) || Niekro (0–1) || – || 2:17 || 50,511 || 0–1 || L1
|-style="background:#fcc;"
| 2 || April 11 || 9:05p.m. CST || @ Dodgers || L 4–7 || Hooton (1–0) || Sutton (0–1) || – || 2:56 || 51,691 || 0–2 || L2
|-style="background:#fcc;"
| 3 || April 12 || 3:05p.m. CST || @ Dodgers || L 2–3 || Sutcliffe (1–0) || Ruhle (0–1) || Howe (1) || 2:16 || 50,734 || 0–3 || L3
|-style="background:#fcc;"
| 4 || April 13 || 7:35p.m. CST || Braves || L 1–2  || Camp (1–0) || Sambito (0–1) || Bradford (1) || 2:57 || 34,961 || 0–4 || L4
|-style="background:#cfc;"
| 5 || April 14 || 7:35p.m. CST || Braves || W 8–2 || Niekro (1–1) || Walk (0–1) || – || 2:38 || 21,440 || 1–4 || W1
|-style="background:#cfc;"
| 6 || April 15 || 7:35p.m. CST || Braves || W 2–0 || Ryan (1–0) || Boggs (0–1) || LaCorte (1) || 2:00 || 22,365 || 2–4 || W2
|-style="background:#fcc;"
| 7 || April 17 || 7:35p.m. CST || Pirates || L 3–4 || Rhoden (2–0) || Sutton (0–2) || Romo (2) || 2:28 || 39,119 || 2–5 || L1
|-style="background:#fcc;"
| 8 || April 18 || 12:50p.m. CST || Pirates || L 3–6  || Jackson (1–0) || Smith (0–1) || – || 3:06 || 29,790 || 2–6 || L2
|-style="background:#fcc;"
| 9 || April 19 || 2:05p.m. CST || Pirates || L 0–2 || Scurry (1–0) || Niekro (1–2) || Solomon (1) || 2:21 || 30,394 || 2–7 || L3
|-style="background:#fcc;"
| 10 || April 20 || 7:35p.m. CST || Dodgers || L 2–5 || Hooton (3–0) || Andújar (0–1) || Goltz (1) || 2:34 || 21,370 || 2–8 || L4
|-style="background:#cfc;"
| 11 || April 21 || 7:35p.m. CST || Dodgers || W 1–0 || Knepper (1–0) || Reuss (0–1) || – || 1:48 || 21,904 || 3–8 || W1
|-style="background:#fcc;"
| 12 || April 22 || 6:05p.m. CST || Dodgers || L 0–1 || Valenzuela (4–0) || Sutton (0–3) || – || 2:24 || 22,830 || 3–9 || L1
|-style="background:#fcc;"
| 13 || April 23 || 7:35p.m. CST || Reds || L 4–5  || Price (1–0) || Smith (0–2) || Moskau (1) || 3:06 || 23,173 || 3–10 || L2
|-style="background:#fcc;"
| 14 || April 24 || 7:35p.m. CST || Reds || L 0–3 || Pastore (1–0) || Niekro (1–3) || – || 2:23 || 27,087 || 3–11 || L3
|-style="background:#fcc;"
| 15 || April 25 || 12:50p.m. CST || Reds || L 1–2 || Berenyi (2–0) || Ryan (1–1) || Hume (1) || 2:45 || 19,957 || 3–12 || L4
|-style="background:#cfc;"
| 16 || April 26 || 2:05p.m. CDT || Reds || W 1–0 || Knepper (2–0) || Soto (1–3) || – || 2:21 || 23,428 || 4–12 || W1
|-style="background:#cfc;"
| 17 || April 28 || 6:35p.m. CDT || @ Braves || W 2–1 || Sutton (1–3) || Montefusco (1–2) || Smith (1) || 2:34 || 8,669 || 5–12 || W2
|-style="background:#cfc;"
| 18 || April 29 || 6:35p.m. CDT || @ Braves || W 5–4 || LaCorte (1–0) || Camp (2–1) || – || 3:18 || 8,334 || 6–12 || W3
|-style="background:#cfc;"
| 19 || April 30 || 6:35p.m. CDT || @ Braves || W 5–1 || Niekro (2–3) || Boggs (1–3) || – || 2:19 || 10,006 || 7–12 || W4
|-

|-style="background:#cfc;"
| 20 || May 1 || 6:35p.m. CDT || @ Pirates || W 5–3 || Sambito (1–1) || Solomon (0–1) || – || 3:01 || 7,012 || 8–12 || W5
|-style="background:#fcc;"
| 21 || May 2 || 6:05p.m. CDT || @ Pirates || L 4–5  || Solomon (1–1) || Smith (0–3) || – || 3:56 || 21,993 || 8–13 || L1
|-style="background:#cfc;"
| 22 || May 3 || 12:35p.m. CDT || @ Pirates || W 3–1 || Sutton (2–3) || Bibby (1–1) || Smith (2) || 3:15 || 10,438 || 9–13 || W1
|-style="background:#cfc;"
| 23 || May 4 || 1:35p.m. CDT || @ Cubs || W 5–4 || Andújar (1–1) || Krukow (1–2) || Sambito (1) || 3:02 || 2,941 || 10–13 || W2
|-style="background:#cfc;"
| 24 || May 5 || 1:35p.m. CDT || @ Cubs || W 4–3 || Smith (1–3) || Smith (0–2) || – || 2:41 || 2,092 || 11–13 || W3
|-style="background:#fcc;"
| 25 || May 6 || 1:35p.m. CDT || @ Cubs || L 1–2  || Smith (1–2) || LaCorte (1–1) || – || 3:27 || 2,572 || 11–14 || W4
|-style="background:#cfc;"
| 26 || May 7 || 1:35p.m. CDT || @ Cubs || W 6–0 || Knepper (3–0) || Martz (1–1) || – || 2:40 || 3,112 || 12–14 || L1
|-style="background:#fcc;"
| 27 || May 8 || 6:35p.m. CDT || @ Reds || L 0–4 || Seaver (3–1) || Sutton (2–4) || – || 2:21 || 31,961 || 12–15 || L1
|-style="background:#fcc;"
| 28 || May 9 || 1:15p.m. CDT || @ Reds || L 5–9 || Berenyi (3–1) || Andújar (1–2) || – || 2:38 || 30,860 || 12–16 || L2
|-style="background:#cfc;"
| 29 || May 10 || 1:35p.m. CDT || @ Reds || W 7–5 || Niekro (3–3) || Pastore (1–1) || LaCorte (2) || 2:44 || 31,903 || 13–16 || W1
|-style="background:#cfc;"
| 30 || May 11 || 6:35p.m. CDT || @ Reds || W 5–0 || Ryan (2–1) || LaCoss (1–4) || – || 2:36 || 11,795 || 14–16 || W2
|-style="background:#fcc;"
| 31 || May 12 || 7:35p.m. CDT || Cardinals || L 2–3  || Sutter (1–1) || Sambito (1–2) || Kaat (2) || 2:26 || 20,020 || 13–17 || L1
|-style="background:#cfc;"
| 32 || May 13 || 7:35p.m. CDT || Cardinals || W 3–0 || Sutton (3–4) || Shirley (4–1) || – || 2:24 || 21,705 || 14–17 || W1
|-style="background:#fcc;"
| 33 || May 14 || 7:35p.m. CDT || Cardinals || L 6–7 || Otten (1–0) || Sambito (1–3) || Sutter (6) || 2:54 || 20,042 || 14–18 || L1
|-style="background:#cfc;"
| 34 || May 15 || 7:35p.m. CDT || Cubs || W 5–0 || Niekro (4–3) || Caudill (0–3) || – || 2:16 || 23,718 || 16–18 || W1
|-style="background:#cfc;"
| 35 || May 16 || 7:35p.m. CDT || Cubs || W 6–1 || Ryan (3–1) || Martz (1–2) || Sambito (2) || 2:48 || 43,726 || 17–18 || W2
|-style="background:#cfc;"
| 36 || May 17 || 2:35p.m. CDT || Cubs || W 6–1 || Knepper (4–0) || Krukow (1–4) || – || 2:34 || 34,068 || 18–18 || W3
|-style="background:#fcc;"
| 37 || May 19 || 7:35p.m. CDT || @ Cardinals || L 12–15 || Kaat (2–0) || Sprowl (0–1) || – || 3:03 || 14,585 || 18–19 || L1
|-style="background:#cfc;"
| 38 || May 20 || 7:35p.m. CDT || @ Cardinals || W 4–3  || Niekro (5–3) || Sutter (1–2) || Sambito (3) || 2:47 || 19,175 || 19–19 || W1
|-style="background:#fcc;"
| 39 || May 21 || 7:35p.m. CDT || @ Cardinals || L 1–3 || Martin (1–0) || Ryan (3–2) || – || 2:13 || 19,823 || 19–20 || L1
|-style="background:#fcc;"
| 40 || May 22 || 7:35p.m. CDT || Giants || L 3–6  || Minton (2–2) || Andújar (1–3) || – || 4:38 || 30,377 || 19–21 || L2
|-style="background:#cfc;"
| 41 || May 23 || 7:35p.m. CDT || Giants || W 5–3 || LaCorte (2–1) || Whitson (1–5) || – || 3:09 || 38,586 || 20–21 || W1
|-style="background:#fcc;"
| 42 || May 24 || 5:00p.m. CDT || Giants || L 1–2 || Blue (4–3) || Sutton (3–5) || Minton (9) || 2:26 || 34,922 || 20–22 || L1
|-style="background:#cfc;"
| 43 || May 25 || 7:35p.m. CDT || Padres || W 6–3 || Niekro (6–3) || Mura (1–7) || Sambito (4) || 2:41 || 19,025 || 21–22 || W1
|-style="background:#cfc;"
| 44 || May 26 || 7:35p.m. CDT || Padres || W 1–0 || Ryan (4–2) || Eichelberger (4–3) || Sambito (5) || 2:23 || 17,709 || 22–22 || W2
|-style="background:#cfc;"
| 45 || May 27 || 7:35p.m. CDT || Padres || W 1–0 || Knepper (5–0) || Welsh (2–3) || – || 1:50 || 21,256 || 23–22 || W3
|-style="background:#fcc;"
| 46 || May 29 || 9:35p.m. CDT || @ Giants || L 1–3 || Blue (5–3) || Sutton (3–6) || Holland (2) || 2:22 || 8,397 || 23–23 || L1
|-style="background:#cfc;"
| 47 || May 30 || 3:05p.m. CDT || @ Giants || W 9–8  || Andújar (2–3) || Breining (1–1) || Ruhle (1) || 4:33 || 8,869 || 24–23 || W1
|-style="background:#fcc;"
| 48 || May 31 || 3:05p.m. CDT || @ Giants || L 1–6 || Griffin (4–3) || Ryan (4–3) || Holland (3) || 2:34 || 20,626 || 24–24 || L1
|-

|-style="background:#cfc;"
| 49 || June 2 || 9:05p.m. CDT || @ Padres || W 2–1 || LaCorte (3–1) || Welsh (2–4) || Sambito (6) || 2:19 || 9,671 || 25–24 || W1
|-style="background:#cfc;"
| 50 || June 3 || 9:05p.m. CDT || @ Padres || W 6–1 || Sutton (4–6) || Wise (2–5) || – || 2:25 || 10,023 || 26–24 || W2
|-style="background:#fcc;"
| 51 || June 4 || 3:05p.m. CDT || @ Padres || L 5–7 || Mura (3–7) || Niekro (6–4) || Lucas (8) || 2:31 || 12,403 || 26–25 || L1
|-style="background:#cfc;"
| 52 || June 5 || 7:35p.m. CDT || Mets || W 3–0 || Ryan (5–3) || Jones (1–6) || – || 2:09 || 28,085 || 27–25 || W1
|-style="background:#cfc;"
| 53 || June 6 || 7:35p.m. CDT || Mets || W 6–2 || Ruhle (1–1) || Zachry (5–6) || Smith (3) || 2:17 || 42,478 || 28–25 || W2
|-style="background:#fcc;"
| 54 || June 7 || 7:35p.m. CDT || Mets || L 1–3 || Scott (3–4) || Knepper (5–1) || Allen (6) || 2:13 || 29,873 || 28–26 || L1
|-style="background:#fcc;"
| 55 || June 8 || 7:35p.m. CDT || @ Phillies || L 3–4 || Ruthven (8–3) || Sutton (4–7) || McGraw (6) || 2:41 || 31,664 || 28–27 || L2
|-style="background:#fcc;"
| 56 || June 9 || 6:35p.m. CDT || @ Phillies || L 3–10 || Bystrom (4–3) || Niekro (6–5) || Reed (5) || 2:17 || 33,978 || 28–28 || L3
|-style="background:#fcc;"
| 57 || June 10 || 6:35p.m. CDT || @ Phillies || L 4–5 || Carlton (9–1) || LaCorte (3–2) || McGraw (7) || 2:22 || 57,386 || 28–29 || L4
|-

|- style="text-align:center;"
| Legend:       = Win       = Loss       = PostponementBold = Astros team member

Regular season (games canceled by the 1981 Major League Baseball strike)

|-style="background:#bbb;"
|–|| June 12 || || @ Mets || colspan=8 | Canceled (Strike)
|-style="background:#bbb;"
|–|| June 13 || || @ Mets || colspan=8 | Canceled (Strike)
|-style="background:#bbb;"
|–|| June 14 || || @ Mets || colspan=8 | Canceled (Strike)
|-style="background:#bbb;"
|–|| June 15 || || @ Expos || colspan=8 | Canceled (Strike)
|-style="background:#bbb;"
|–|| June 16 || || @ Expos || colspan=8 | Canceled (Strike)
|-style="background:#bbb;"
|–|| June 17 || || Phillies || colspan=8 | Canceled (Strike)
|-style="background:#bbb;"
|–|| June 18 || || Phillies || colspan=8 | Canceled (Strike)
|-style="background:#bbb;"
|–|| June 19 || || Expos || colspan=8 | Canceled (Strike)
|-style="background:#bbb;"
|–|| June 20 || || Expos || colspan=8 | Canceled (Strike)
|-style="background:#bbb;"
|–|| June 21 || || Expos || colspan=8 | Canceled (Strike)
|-style="background:#bbb;"
|–|| June 23 || || @ Pirates || colspan=8 | Canceled (Strike)
|-style="background:#bbb;"
|–|| June 24 || || @ Pirates || colspan=8 | Canceled (Strike)
|-style="background:#bbb;"
|–|| June 25 || || @ Pirates || colspan=8 | Canceled (Strike)
|-style="background:#bbb;"
|–|| June 26 || || Dodgers || colspan=8 | Canceled (Strike)
|-style="background:#bbb;"
|–|| June 27 || || Dodgers || colspan=8 | Canceled (Strike)
|-style="background:#bbb;"
|–|| June 28 || || Dodgers || colspan=8 | Canceled (Strike)
|-style="background:#bbb;"
|–|| June 29 || || Reds || colspan=8 | Canceled (Strike)
|-style="background:#bbb;"
|–|| June 30 || || Reds || colspan=8 | Canceled (Strike)
|-

|-style="background:#bbb;"
|–|| July 1 || || Reds || colspan=8 | Canceled (Strike)
|-style="background:#bbb;"
|–|| July 3 || || @ Braves || colspan=8 | Canceled (Strike)
|-style="background:#bbb;"
|–|| July 4 || || @ Braves || colspan=8 | Canceled (Strike)
|-style="background:#bbb;"
|–|| July 5 || || @ Braves || colspan=8 | Canceled (Strike)
|-style="background:#bbb;"
|–|| July 7 || || @ Dodgers || colspan=8 | Canceled (Strike)
|-style="background:#bbb;"
|–|| July 8 || || @ Dodgers || colspan=8 | Canceled (Strike)
|-style="background:#bbb;"
|–|| July 9 || || @ Dodgers || colspan=8 | Canceled (Strike)
|-style="background:#bbb;"
|–|| July 10 || || Braves || colspan=8 | Canceled (Strike)
|-style="background:#bbb;"
|–|| July 11 || || Braves || colspan=8 | Canceled (Strike)
|-style="background:#bbb;"
|–|| July 12 || || Braves || colspan=8 | Canceled (Strike)
|-style="background:#bbb;"
|–|| July 16 || || @ Reds || colspan=8 | Canceled (Strike)
|-style="background:#bbb;"
|–|| July 17 || || @ Reds || colspan=8 | Canceled (Strike)
|-style="background:#bbb;"
|–|| July 18 || || @ Reds || colspan=8 | Canceled (Strike)
|-style="background:#bbb;"
|–|| July 19 || || @ Cubs || colspan=8 | Canceled (Strike)
|-style="background:#bbb;"
|–|| July 20 || || @ Cubs || colspan=8 | Canceled (Strike)
|-style="background:#bbb;"
|–|| July 21 || || Pirates || colspan=8 | Canceled (Strike)
|-style="background:#bbb;"
|–|| July 22 || || Pirates || colspan=8 | Canceled (Strike)
|-style="background:#bbb;"
|–|| July 23 || || Pirates || colspan=8 | Canceled (Strike)
|-style="background:#bbb;"
|–|| July 24 || || Cardinals || colspan=8 | Canceled (Strike)
|-style="background:#bbb;"
|–|| July 25 || || Cardinals || colspan=8 | Canceled (Strike)
|-style="background:#bbb;"
|–|| July 26 || || Cardinals || colspan=8 | Canceled (Strike)
|-style="background:#bbb;"
|–|| July 27 || || Cubs || colspan=8 | Canceled (Strike)
|-style="background:#bbb;"
|–|| July 28 || || Cubs || colspan=8 | Canceled (Strike)
|-style="background:#bbb;"
|–|| July 29 || || Cubs || colspan=8 | Canceled (Strike)
|-style="background:#bbb;"
|–|| July 31 || || @ Cardinals || colspan=8 | Canceled (Strike)
|-

|-style="background:#bbb;"
|–|| August 1 || || @ Cardinals || colspan=8 | Canceled (Strike)
|-style="background:#bbb;"
|–|| August 2 || || @ Cardinals || colspan=8 | Canceled (Strike)
|-style="background:#bbb;"
|–|| August 3 || || Giants || colspan=8 | Canceled (Strike)
|-style="background:#bbb;"
|–|| August 4 || || Giants || colspan=8 | Canceled (Strike)
|-style="background:#bbb;"
|–|| August 5 || || Giants || colspan=8 | Canceled (Strike)
|-style="background:#bbb;"
|–|| August 7 || || Padres || colspan=8 | Canceled (Strike)
|-style="background:#bbb;"
|–|| August 8 || || Padres || colspan=8 | Canceled (Strike)
|-style="background:#bbb;"
|–|| August 9 || || Padres || colspan=8 | Canceled (Strike)
|-

|- style="text-align:center;"
| Legend:       = Win       = Loss       = PostponementBold = Astros team member

Regular season (Second half)

|- style="text-align:center; background:#bbcaff;"
| colspan="12" | 52nd All-Star Game in Cleveland, Ohio
|-style="background:#cfc;"
| 1  || August 10 || 9:35p.m. CDT || @ Giants || W 6–5 || Sambito (2–3) || Breining (2–2) || LaCorte (3) || 3:08 || 11,115 || 1–0  || W1
|-style="background:#fcc;"
| 2  || August 11 || 9:35p.m. CDT || @ Giants || L 2–3 || Griffin (5–5) || Niekro (6–6) || Minton (10) || 2:36 || 12,354 || 1–1  || L1
|-style="background:#cfc;"
| 3  || August 12 || 2:05p.m. CDT || @ Giants || W 5–4 || Sambito (3–3) || Holland (3–3) || Smith (1) || 2:51 || 8,707 || 2–1  || W1
|-style="background:#fcc;"
| 4  || August 13 || 3:05p.m. CDT || @ Padres || L 1–9 || Welsh (4–4) || Knepper (5–2) || – || 2:29 || 4,899 || 2–2  || L1
|-style="background:#cfc;"
| 5  || August 14 || 9:05p.m. CDT || @ Padres || W 5–1 || Ryan (6–3) || Lollar (1–5) || – || 2:24 || 8,414 || 3–2  || W1
|-style="background:#cfc;"
| 6  || August 15 || 9:05p.m. CDT || @ Padres || W 5–0 || Sutton (5–7) || Eichelberger (6–4) || – || 1:59 || 5,852 || 4–2  || W2
|-style="background:#cfc;"
| 7  || August 16 || 3:05p.m. CDT || @ Padres || W 3–0 || Niekro (7–6) || Mura (4–9) || Smith (4) || 2:16 || 5,880 || 5–2  || W3
|-style="background:#fcc;"
| 8  || August 17 || 7:35p.m. CDT || Expos || L 2–6 || Burris (5–5) || Ruhle (1–2) || Fryman (4) || 2:19 || 24,203 || 5–3  || L1
|-style="background:#cfc;"
| 9  || August 18 || 7:35p.m. CDT || Expos || W 4–2 || Knepper (6–2) || Rogers (8–5) || Sambito (7) || 2:04 || 23,306 || 6–3  || W1
|-style="background:#cfc;"
| 10  || August 19 || 7:35p.m. CDT || Expos || W 9–1 || Ryan (7–3) || Sanderson (6–4) || Smith (5) || 2:39 || 27,169 || 7–3  || W2
|-style="background:#fcc;"
| 11  || August 21 || 7:05p.m. CDT || @ Phillies || L 4–5 || Lyle (6–2) || Ruhle (1–3) || McGraw (8) || 2:41 || 31,693 || 7–4  || L1
|-style="background:#fcc;"
| 12  || August 22 || 1:15p.m. CDT || @ Phillies || L 4–8 || Ruthven (9–5) || Niekro (7–7) || – || 2:16 || 35,199 || 7–5  || L2
|-style="background:#fcc;"
| 13  || August 23 || 6:05p.m. CDT || @ Phillies || L 0–6 || Carlton (10–3) || Knepper (6–3) || – || 1:51 || 30,630 || 7–6  || L3
|-style="background:#fcc;"
| 14  || August 25 || 7:05p.m. CDT || @ Mets || L 1–2 || Marshall (1–0) || Sambito (3–4) || – || 2:32 || 15,622 || 7–7  || L4
|-style="background:#cfc;"
| 15  || August 26 || 7:05p.m. CDT || @ Mets || W 9–3 || Sutton (6–7) || Zachry (6–9) || – || 2:34 || 16,731 || 8–7  || W1
|-style="background:#fcc;"
| 16  || August 27 || 1:05p.m. CDT || @ Mets || L 2–3 || Marshall (2–0) || Sambito (3–5) || Allen (12) || 2:28 || 17,488 || 8–8  || L1
|-style="background:#cfc;"
| 17  || August 28 || 7:35p.m. CDT || Phillies || W 3–2  || Smith (2–3) || Lyle (6–3) || – || 2:37 || 29,482 || 9–8  || W1
|-style="background:#cfc;"
| 18  || August 29  || 5:35p.m. CDT || Phillies || W 6–1 || Ruhle (2–3) || Davis (0–2) || – || 2:22 || N/A || 10–8  || W2
|-style="background:#cfc;"
| 19  || August 29  || 8:32p.m. CDT || Phillies || W 2–1 || Smith (1–0) || Noles (0–1) || LaCorte (4) || 2:01 || 33,327 || 11–8  || W3
|-style="background:#cfc;"
| 20  || August 30 || 7:35p.m. CDT || Phillies || W 5–4  || Smith (3–3) || Lyle (6–4) || – || 2:53 || 23,102 || 12–8  || W4
|-style="background:#cfc;"
| 21  || August 31 || 7:35p.m. CDT || Mets || W 6–1 || Sutton (7–7) || Zachry (6–10) || – || 2:27 || 10,669 || 13–8  || W5
|-

|-style="background:#cfc;"
| 22  || September 1 || 7:35p.m. CDT || Mets || W 3–2 || Sambito (4–5) || Marshall (2–1) || – || 2:39 || 16,339 || 14–8  || W6
|-style="background:#cfc;"
| 23  || September 2 || 7:35p.m. CDT || Mets || W 8–0 || Knepper (7–3) || Scott (4–8) || – || 2:21 || 18,938 || 15–8  || W7
|-style="background:#cfc;"
| 24  || September 3 || 6:35p.m. CDT || @ Expos || W 2–1 || Ruhle (3–3) || Sanderson (7–5) || Smith (6) || 2:20 || 24,833 || 16–8  || W8
|-style="background:#cfc;"
| 25  || September 4 || 6:35p.m. CDT || @ Expos || W 5–0 || Ryan (8–3) || Gullickson (4–7) || Sambito (8) || 2:54 || 32,580 || 17–8  || W9
|-style="background:#fcc;"
| 26  || September 5 || 1:15p.m. CDT || @ Expos || L 2–5 || Burris (7–5) || Sutton (7–8) || – || 2:13 || 30,471 || 17–9  || L1
|-style="background:#cfc;"
| 27  || September 6 || 12:35p.m. CDT || @ Expos || W 4–3  || LaCorte (4–2) || Sosa (1–2) || – || 3:33 || 47,193 || 18–9  || W1
|-style="background:#cfc;"
| 28  || September 7 || 6:35p.m. CDT || @ Braves || W 3–2 || Smith (4–3) || Camp (7–2) || Sambito (9) || 2:40 || 7,358 || 19–9  || W2
|-style="background:#fcc;"
| 29  || September 8 || 6:35p.m. CDT || @ Braves || L 2–3 || Camp (8–2) || Smith (1–1) || – || 2:13 || 2,800 || 19–10  || L1
|-style="background:#fcc;"
| 30  || September 9 || 6:35p.m. CDT || @ Braves || L 0–9 || Niekro (7–5) || Ryan (8–4) || – || 2:34 || 4,482 || 19–11  || L2
|-style="background:#cfc;"
| 31  || September 11 || 7:35p.m. CDT || Giants || W 6–0 || Sutton (8–8) || Blue (8–6) || – || 2:30 || 23,677 || 20–11  || W1
|-style="background:#cfc;"
| 32  || September 12 || 7:35p.m. CDT || Giants || W 5–2 || Niekro (8–7) || Whitson (5–8) || Smith (7) || 2:39 || 35,867 || 21–11  || W2
|-style="background:#cfc;"
| 33  || September 13 || 5:00p.m. CDT || Giants || W 3–0 || Knepper (8–3) || Alexander (8–7) || LaCorte (5) || 2:32 || 19,642 || 22–11  || W3
|-style="background:#fcc;"
| 34  || September 14 || 7:35p.m. CDT || Reds || L 2–4 || Berenyi (8–5) || Ruhle (3–4) || – || 2:30 || 19,742 || 22–12  || L1
|-style="background:#fcc;"
| 35  || September 15 || 5:00p.m. CDT || Reds || L 0–4 || Leibrandt (1–0) || Ryan (8–5) || – || 2:26 || 16,354 || 22–13  || L2
|-style="background:#cfc;"
| 36  || September 16 || 9:05p.m. CDT || @ Padres || W 5–2 || Sutton (9–8) || Lollar (1–8) || Sambito (10) || 2:35 || 4,241 || 23–13  || W1
|-style="background:#cfc;"
| 37  || September 17 || 9:05p.m. CDT || @ Padres || W 9–0 || Niekro (9–7) || Mura (5–13) || – || 2:14 || 2,428 || 24–13  || W2
|-style="background:#fcc;"
| 38  || September 18 || 9:35p.m. CDT || @ Giants || L 2–5 || Alexander (9–7) || Knepper (8–4) || Holland (7) || 2:26 || 8,183 || 24–14  || L1
|-style="background:#cfc;"
| 39  || September 19 || 3:05p.m. CDT || @ Giants || W 8–1 || Ruhle (4–4) || Griffin (8–7) || – || 2:26 || 11,522 || 25–14  || W1
|-style="background:#cfc;"
| 40  || September 20 || 3:05p.m. CDT || @ Giants || W 7–3 || Ryan (9–5) || Lavelle (0–6) || – || 3:04 || 16,824 || 26–14  || W2
|-style="background:#cfc;"
| 41  || September 22 || 7:35p.m. CDT || Braves || W 3–0 || Sutton (10–8) || Perry (7–8) || – || 2:16 || 22,564 || 27–14  || W3
|-style="background:#fcc;"
| 42  || September 23 || 7:35p.m. CDT || Braves || L 1–3 || Mahler (6–6) || Niekro (9–8) || – || 2:13 || 24,142 || 27–15  || L1
|-style="background:#cfc;"
| 43  || September 24 || 7:35p.m. CDT || Braves || W 5–3 || Knepper (9–4) || McWilliams (1–1) || Smith (8) || 2:17 || 23,341 || 28–15  || W1
|-style="background:#fcc;"
| 44  || September 25 || 7:35p.m. CDT || Dodgers || L 0–3 || Hooton (11–6) || Ruhle (4–5) || – || 2:18 || 35,481 || 28–16  || L1
|-style="background:#cfc;"
| 45  || September 26 || 1:20p.m. CDT || Dodgers || W 5–0 || Ryan (10–5) || Power (1–3) || – || 2:46 || 32,115 || 29–16  || W1
|-style="background:#cfc;"
| 46  || September 27 || 5:05p.m. CDT || Dodgers || W 4–1 || Sutton (11–8) || Valenzuela (13–6) || – || 2:23 || 41,686 || 30–16  || W2
|-style="background:#cfc;"
| 47  || September 28 || 7:35p.m. CDT || Padres || W 2–1 || Sambito (5–5) || Eichelberger (8–8) || – || 2:07 || 21,576 || 31–16  || W3
|-style="background:#fcc;"
| 48  || September 29 || 7:35p.m. CDT || Padres || L 1–2 || Wise (4–8) || Knepper (9–5) || Lucas (12) || 2:19 || 34,732 || 31–17  || L1
|-style="background:#fcc;"
| 49  || September 30 || 6:35p.m. CDT || @ Reds || L 2–3 || Soto (11–9) || Ruhle (4–6) || Hume (13) || 2:14 || 24,394 || 31–18  || L2
|-

|-style="background:#cfc;"
| 50  || October 1 || 4:00p.m. CDT || @ Reds || W 8–1 || Ryan (11–5) || Berenyi (9–6) || – || 3:12 || 26,484 || 32–18  || W1
|-style="background:#fcc;"
| 51  || October 2 || 9:30p.m. CDT || @ Dodgers || L 1–6 || Reuss (10–4) || Sutton (11–9) || – || 2:30 || 46,108 || 32–19  || L1
|-style="background:#fcc;"
| 52  || October 3 || 2:50p.m. CDT || @ Dodgers || L 2–7 || Welch (9–5) || Niekro (9–9) || – || 2:43 || 42,272 || 32–20  || L2
|-style="background:#cfc;"
| 53  || October 4 || 3:00p.m. CDT || @ Dodgers || W 5–3 || Smith (5–2) || Goltz (2–7) || – || 3:17 || 47,072 || 33–20  || W1
|-

|- style="text-align:center;"
| Legend:       = Win       = Loss       = PostponementBold = Astros team member

Postseason Game log

|-style="background:#cfc;"
| 1 || October 6 || 7:15p.m. CDT || Dodgers || W 3–1 || Ryan (1–0) || Stewart (0–1) || – || 2:22 || 44,836 || HOU 1–0 || W1
|-style="background:#cfc;"
| 2 || October 7 || 12:05p.m. CDT || Dodgers || W 1–0  || Sambito (1–0) || Stewart (0–2) || – || 3:39 || 42,398 || HOU 2–0 || W2
|-style="background:#fcc;"
| 3 || October 9 || 3:05p.m. CDT || @ Dodgers || L 1–6 || Hooton (1–0) || Knepper (0–1) || – || 2:35 || 46,820 || HOU 2–1 || L1
|-style="background:#fcc;"
| 4 || October 10 || 7:15p.m. CDT || @ Dodgers || L 1–2 || Valenzuela (1–0) || Ruhle (0–1) || – || 2:00 || 55,983 || Tied 2–2 || L2
|-style="background:#fcc;"
| 5 || October 11 || 3:05p.m. CDT || @ Dodgers || L 0–4 || Reuss (1–0) || Ryan (1–1) || – || 2:52 || 55,979 || LA 3–2 || L3
|-

|- style="text-align:center;"
| Legend:       = Win       = Loss       = PostponementBold = Astros team member

Player stats

Batting

Starters by position 
Note: Pos = Position; G = Games played; AB = At bats; H = Hits; Avg. = Batting average; HR = Home runs; RBI = Runs batted in

Other batters 
Note: G = Games played; AB = At bats; H = Hits; Avg. = Batting average; HR = Home runs; RBI = Runs batted in

Pitching

Starting pitchers 
Note: G = Games pitched; IP = Innings pitched; W = Wins; L = Losses; ERA = Earned run average; SO = Strikeouts

Other pitchers 
Note: G = Games pitched; IP = Innings pitched; W = Wins; L = Losses; ERA = Earned run average; SO = Strikeouts

Relief pitchers 
Note: G = Games pitched; IP = Innings pitched; W = Wins; L = Losses; SV = Saves; ERA = Earned run average; SO = Strikeouts

1981 National League Division Series 

Los Angeles Dodgers vs. Houston Astros

Los Angeles wins series, 3-2.

Farm system

References

External links
1981 Houston Astros season at Baseball Reference

Houston Astros seasons
1981 Major League Baseball season
Houston